The Buranhém River - also known as Rio do Peixe - is a watercourse flowing through the states of Minas Gerais and Bahia, in Brazil. It ends its course at the Atlantic Ocean just by the city of Porto Seguro. The city holds a distinctive place in Brazilian history as in 1500 it was the first landing point of Portuguese navigators commanded by Pedro Álvares Cabral, who discovered Brazil.

See also
List of rivers of Bahia

References
Brazilian Ministry of Transport

Rivers of Bahia